The Caspar Westervelt House is located in Teaneck, Bergen County, New Jersey, United States. The house was built in 1763 and was added to the National Register of Historic Places on January 10, 1983.

See also
National Register of Historic Places listings in Bergen County, New Jersey
 List of the oldest buildings in New Jersey

References

Houses completed in 1763
Houses in Bergen County, New Jersey
National Register of Historic Places in Bergen County, New Jersey
Teaneck, New Jersey
New Jersey Register of Historic Places
Stone houses in New Jersey